Big Hero 6 is a superhero team appearing in American comic books published by Marvel Comics and created by Man of Action.

In 2014, Walt Disney Animation Studios produced the computer-animated film Big Hero 6,  inspired by the characters. In 2017, a television series based on the film, titled Big Hero 6: The Series, premiered. The characters also appeared in the video game Kingdom Hearts III in the San Fransokyo world.

Publication history
Created by Steven T. Seagle and Duncan Rouleau, Big Hero 6 was first intended to appear in Alpha Flight #17 (Dec. 1998). Instead, the team appeared in their own self-titled, three-issue miniseries by writer Scott Lobdell and artist Gus Vasquez. However, due to scheduling complications, the miniseries was published prior to Alpha Flight #17.

The team appears in Alpha Flight #9 (Jan. 2005).

The team also appears in a subsequent five-issue miniseries, which was launched by Marvel Comics in September 2008.

The characters were licensed to IDW Publishing for Big Hero 6: The Series in 2019.

Fictional team biography
In the original comics, the Japanese government needed a team of state-sanctioned superheroes, so they consulted the "Giri", a top-secret consortium of politicians and business entities. The Giri was formed to recruit and train potential individuals for "Big Hero 6", a team of superhuman operatives. Despite reservations by some members of the Giri, Silver Samurai, a freelance ronin and former bodyguard of the terrorist Viper, was appointed as the team's field commander. Secret agent Honey Lemon, inventor of the nanotechnology-based Power Purse from which she can access any object, also agreed to join the team. The tough-talking GoGo Tomago, able to transubstantiate her body into a fiery force blast by uttering her code name, was released from prison on the condition that she serve on the team. Finally, the Machiavellian bureaucrat known only as Mr. Oshima is appointed as the Giri's spokesperson and coordinates the team's activities.

Government scientists then identified 13-year-old boy genius Hiro Takachiho as a potential operative. Unimpressed with the Silver Samurai, Hiro declines joining the team until his mother is kidnapped by the Everwraith, the astral embodiment of all those killed in the 1945 nuclear attacks on Hiroshima and Nagasaki. Hiro creates Baymax, a synthetic bodyguard capable of transforming into a dragon, using the brain engrams of his dead father. With Baymax, Hiro reluctantly joins forces with the Big Hero 6 to prevent the Everwraith from slaughtering millions in downtown Tokyo. During the battle, Big Hero 6 is joined by Sunfire, Japan's premier superhero, who is a mutant with the ability to heat matter into plasma. Sunfire becomes instrumental in the Everwraith's defeat.

Soon afterwards, Big Hero 6 moves their headquarters from the Giri office building to Japan's Cool World Amusement Park. Here they are attacked by X the Unknowable, a monster born from a child's drawings who is capable of transforming its atomic structure into any form and shape. With the help of the Canadian superhero team, Alpha Flight, Big Hero 6 destroys X the Unknowable in the fires of Mount Fuji. Afterwards, Big Hero 6 continues to protect Japan from various threats such as a freak blizzard caused by the Crimson Cowl and her Masters of Evil.

Eventually, Sunfire leaves Big Hero 6 so that he can work at Charles Xavier's X-Corporation office in Mumbai, India. His spot on the team is filled by Sunpyre, a young woman with similar solar-based powers who is pulled into this reality through the Power Purse and therefore comes to idolize Honey Lemon. Similarly, after Silver Samurai is seemingly slain in an altercation with the assassin Elektra in Iraq, his spot on the team is filled by the enigmatic Ebon Samurai. With the two most experienced members of Big Hero 6 gone, Hiro becomes the team's new leader.

Sometime during the team's operation, they are attacked by minions of Yandroth. As part of a plan to gain power via superhero battles, Yandroth sends a team of "Living Erasers" into their building. The Living Erasers are capable of transporting beings out of reality. The entire battle takes place off panel and is only mentioned in conjunction with attacks upon other superhero teams.

Later, the members of Big Hero 6 fall victim to a mind-control device implanted within Baymax. Traveling to Canada, the mind-controlled superheroes attack a new incarnation of Alpha Flight at a national park. After a brief battle, the mind-control device is short-circuited and the two teams part as friends. Big Hero 6 returns to Japan to seek out the parties responsible for their mind control.

During the "Ends of the Earth" storyline, Spider-Man calls upon Big Hero 6 to help him defeat Doctor Octopus. The team, now operating from the Giri Institute, confront Doctor Octopus' Octobots, which Dr. Octopus had sent to Japan. They subsequently confront their previous enemy, the Everwraith, and are victorious.

Team roster

Silver Samurai

Silver Samurai (Kenuichio Harada), the illegitimate son of Shingen Yashida, is a Japanese mutant with the power to charge almost anything, most notably his katana, with mutant energy (described as a tachyon field). This enables it to slice through any known substance except adamantium. He wears a suit of traditional samurai armor made of a silver metal, hence the name "Silver Samurai".

He was once the bodyguard for the international terrorist known as the Viper, and later an occasional mercenary, but he became the head of Clan Yashida after his half-sister Mariko Yashida's death. He attempted to pay off his clan's debts to the Yakuza and restore its honor. Although he was once one of Wolverine's greatest enemies, he impressed Wolverine so greatly that Wolverine entrusted him with the care of his adopted daughter, Amiko Kobayashi. The Samurai also helped Wolverine destroy the monster known as "Doombringer", and he later helped Logan rescue Amiko and Yukio from their kidnappers. During his time as a hero, the Silver Samurai became the leader of the Big Hero 6.

Silver Samurai later became the bodyguard of the Japanese prime minister, but was killed while defending his family from a ninja attack.

Sunfire

Sunfire (Shiro Yoshida) was a one-time member of the X-Men and a former nationalist who changed his views after the death of his father. Possessing the ability to fly and generate super-heated blasts of plasma, Shiro became one of Japan's most prominent heroes. He soon left Big Hero 6 to become a member of the X-Corporation, but was disgraced after his past ties to Mystique and the Brotherhood of Evil Mutants were revealed. Sunfire has since appeared as a member of the Marauders and of the Uncanny Avengers.

GoGo Tomago

GoGo Tomago (Leiko Tanaka) is known as the hothead of Big Hero 6. GoGo transforms her body into an explosive ball of energy, which can be projected at vast speeds.

Honey Lemon

Little is known of Honey Lemon's past or how she obtained the purse that gives her "superpowers".

Hiro Takachiho

Hiro Takachiho is the brilliant thirteen-year-old boy who created Baymax; after the departure of Silver Samurai and Sunfire, he becomes the leader of Big Hero 6.

Tadashi Hamada

Baymax

Baymax began his existence as a science project created by Hiro. He was originally designed to be a hydro-powered robotic synthformer, programmed to serve as Hiro's personal bodyguard, butler, and chauffeur. However, prior to the project's completion, Hiro's father died and the young inventor programmed Baymax's artificial intelligence using the brain engrams of his recently departed father. With the thoughts and emotions of Hiro's father, Baymax became much more than a robotic bodyguard. He also functions as Hiro's best friend and father figure and is by his side nearly every hour of every day. Baymax also feels a deep attachment to Hiro's mother; however, Hiro and Baymax decided it was not in their best interest to inform her that her departed husband's memories were used as the basis for Baymax's artificial intelligence.

Ebon Samurai

In his prior life, the Ebon Samurai (Kiochi Keishicho) was a Tokyo police officer who was slain by Silver Samurai during an attack by HYDRA. After making a deal with Amatsu-Mikaboshi, Kiochi was allowed to return to Earth and exact vengeance upon the Silver Samurai. Wielding a demonic katana and permanently bonded to a black variant of his foe's armor, Kiochi was reborn as the Ebon Samurai. Upon learning that Silver Samurai had become the bodyguard of the Japanese prime minister, Kiochi abandoned his quest for revenge, realizing that murdering Harada would constitute a betrayal of his country. He becomes a part of the team but subsequently leaves them to accompany Sunpyre when she returns to the Microverse.

Sunpyre

An alternate reality version of Sunfire's deceased sister Leyu, Lumina is the crown princess of Coronar, a planet hidden deep within the Microverse. As a result of being pulled out of the Microverse through Honey Lemon's purse, Sunpyre worships her as a goddess and joins the Big Hero 6 team out of gratitude. She and the Ebon Samurai later leave the team to return to the Microverse to oust the villains who had taken over Coronar during her absence.

Wasabi-No-Ginger

A trained chef who uses various swords to fight. He can also give form to his Qi-Energy, usually materializing it as throwing knives that can paralyze opponents.

Fred

Nicknamed Fredzilla, he can transform into a Godzilla-like Kaiju and manifest a dinosaur-like aura.

Supporting characters
 Maemi Takachiho – Hiro's mother and the widow of the deceased Tomeo Takachiho. She is very much aware of Hiro's heroic adventures and simply wants him to have a normal childhood. She is unaware that Baymax's brain patterns are based on her husband's.
 Mr. Oshima – A member of the Giri who attempts to recruit Hiro into Big Hero 6.
 Furi Wamu – A Japanese Homeland Security agent and Big Hero 6's liaison. She wears an eye-patch due to an incident involving Badgal, but wears a prosthetic eye. She is constantly monitoring the heroes, making sure that they do not cause any trouble.
 Principal Miyazaki – Hiro's stern principal at the Tesuka Advanced Science Institute.
 Marys Iosama – A girl who is a genius in her own right. She bonds with Hiro and becomes his love interest.
 Dr. Keigi Iosama – Marys' brilliant father who is undercover.

Villains
 Everwraith – The first villain the team ever faced and the closest thing to an arch-nemesis. He is a spectral spirit that encompasses all of those who perished in the bombings of Hiroshima and Nagasaki. Like any ghost, he can fly and phase through walls, but he is also capable of becoming solid and fire energy blasts.
 X the Unknowable – A monster that was willed into reality by a comic book writer named Charles Bentley on his magic typewriter. The creature was initially destroyed once Bentley destroyed the machine, but it was brought back into existence by a boy named Tomi who was writing a surreal comic book about the creature. He supposedly turns into a human after sinking into a volcano and married a beautiful princess.
 Deadline (Dr. Kishi Oramosha) – A misguided scientist who created a doomsday device that would give everyone in the world a "deadline" before they would have to bring universal peace. He was stopped by Sunfire in his first appearance. He attempted to recreate his experiment, but was stopped by a new rendition of Big Hero 6.
 Badgal – A woman with a mysterious past who has the power of energy manipulation and the ability to create three separate personality constructs that she can control when they possess other people. She attempted to steal six crystal artifacts, but was stopped by the Big Hero 6 despite her attempts at possessing the members themselves.
 Brute – Takes on the form of a giant muscle bound figure.
 Whiplash – Takes on the form of a thin figure equipped with a whip.
 Gunsmith – Takes on the form of an average figure equipped with two guns.

In other media

Film adaptation

The Big Hero 6 comics inspired and adapted into the 2014 Disney computer-animated film of the same name. Produced by Walt Disney Animation Studios rather than Marvel Studios, it retains some of the core themes and character concepts from the comics, but makes substantial changes and builds a new story around them. For example, the film's version of Baymax is a friendly robot originally designed to provide medical care, while in the comics he is a bodyguard. The film was released in the United States in November 2014, receiving critical acclaim. It won the Academy Award for Best Animated Feature and was nominated for the Annie Award for Best Animated Feature and the Golden Globe Award for Best Animated Feature Film.

Television
The television series Big Hero 6: The Series premiered on Disney XD in November 2017. The series takes place immediately after the events of the film, and is created by Mark McCorkle and Bob Schooley, creators of Kim Possible and executive produced by McCorkle, Schooley and Nick Filippi. The spinoff series Baymax! was released on Disney+ in June 2022.

Video games
The Disney version of Hiro and Baymax are playable in the game Disney Infinity 2.0. The main characters of the film are also playable characters in the mobile game Disney Magic Kingdoms. The Disney version members of Big Hero 6 made their debut appearance in the Kingdom Hearts series in Kingdom Hearts III, essentially making them the first characters from Marvel Comics to appear in the series.

References

External links
 Big Hero 6 at Marvel.com

 
Marvel Comics adapted into films
Marvel Comics adapted into video games
Marvel Comics superhero teams
Comics adapted into animated films
Fictional septets
Comics characters introduced in 1998
IDW Publishing characters
Japanese superheroes
Characters created by Steven T. Seagle